The following are lists of Indy Car (American Championship car) races from 1905 up to and including the 2020 season.  The lists include IndyCar events sanctioned by the AAA, USAC, CART and IndyCar:

Seasons overview

Current IndyCar races and locations
Current Indy Car events sanctioned by IndyCar including :

Former Indy Car races and locations
The following is a list of former Indycar races: 

Bold: Race abandoned.

*Non-championship race

Cancelled Indy Car races and locations
These races were cancelled during the IndyCar season for various reasons. This includes all sanctioning bodies.

*Non-championship race

Selected records

All-time fastest races

500 mile races
Races averaging 180 mph or greater

All types and all tracks
Races averaging 190 mph or greater

NOTE: Some discrepancy in track calculations used by INDYCAR and CART.

Closest finishes

All races

500 mile races

Road courses

References

 
Races
Indycar